The Investiture of the Gods is a Chinese shenmo television series directed by Wang Weiting and Yang Jianwu. The television series are based on the classical 16th-century novel Fengshen Yanyi (also known as Investiture of the Gods or Creation of the Gods) written by Xu Zhonglin and Lu Xixing.

The success of the series have led to an upcoming sequel Investiture of The Gods II which will air in 2015.

Cast 
 Sammul Chan as Jiang Ziya
 Viann Zhang as Daji
 Vular Jiang as Ma Zhaodi (Jiang Ziya's wife)
 Johnny Zhang as King Wu of Zhou
 Zhang Mingming as Shen Gongbao
 Andrew Wu as King Zhou of Shang
 Yin Yezi as Helan
 Zheng Yitong as Feng Qingqing
 Madina Memet as Wang Pan
 Zhang Zhuowen as Nezha
 Li Jinrong as Erlang Shen
 Zheng Pengfei as Leizhenzi
 Wang Jinduo as Wu Ji
 Zhou Danli as Niu Xiaomei
 Jian Yuanxin as King Wen of Zhou
 Yizhen Chen as Tai Si
 Li Huailong as Li Jing
 Tang Dehui as Yin Shiniang
 He Qiang as Wen Zhong
 Wang Xia as San Yisheng
 Sun Cong as Jinzha
 Lan Haoyu as Muzha
 Zhang Yongqi as Queen Jiang
 Hugo Goh Kwei Ann as Bigan
 Ji Xiaobing as Bo Yikao
 Chen Zhixi as Nüwa
 Liu Zhixi as Shiji Niangniang
 Liu Yuting as Cuiping
 Wang Jingluan as Fairy Flowers
 Kang Lei as Gao He
 Ge Xingyu as Tu Xingsun
 Hao Jinjin as Shuang'er
 Xing Qiqi as Fei Zhong
 Zhao Yang as You Hun

Critical reception 
It's a hot TV series recently in Shandong, Guizhou, Hubei three major Television.

References

External links
 
 The Investiture of the Gods on Sina
 The Investiture of the Gods
 The Investiture of the Gods

2014 Chinese television series debuts
2014 Chinese television series endings
Television shows based on Investiture of the Gods
Television series by Huace Media